The 2022 Group 7 Rugby League season was the 110th season of rugby league in the New South Wales country region of Group 7.

Group 7 All Stars Match

Men's Open

Ladies League Tag

1st Grade

Teams 

Note: The Southern Highlands Storm was initially accepted for first Grade but opted to only process a Regan Cup (3rd Grade) and U18's teams.

Ladder

Regular season

Round 1 

 Round 1 was washed out and postponed to the washout catch up round on the weekend of 30/31 July.

Round 2

Round 3

Round 4

Round 5

Round 6

Round 7

Round 8

Round 9

Round 10

Round 11

Round 12

Round 13

Round 14

Round 15

Round 16

Round 17

Round 18

Reserve Grade (2nd Grade)

Teams

Ladder

Regular season

Round 1 

 Round 1 was washed out and postponed to the washout catch up round on the weekend of 30/31 July.

Round 2

Round 3

Round 4

Round 5

Round 6

Round 7

Round 8

Round 9

Round 10

Round 11

Round 12

Round 13

Round 14

Round 15

Round 16

Round 17

Round 18

Regan Cup (3rd Grade)

Teams

Ladder

Regular season

Round 1 

 Round 1 was washed out and postponed to the washout round on the weekend of 30/31 July.

Round 2 

 Round 2 was postponed due to unplayable playing conditions to the host grounds, and was therefore postponed to the 3rd grade washout round on the weekend of 9/10 July.

Round 3

Round 4

Round 5

Round 6

Round 7

Round 8

Round 9

Round 10

Round 11

Round 12

Round 13

Round 14

Round 15

Round 16

Round 17

Under-18's

Teams

Ladder

Regular season

Round 1 

 Round 1 was washed out and postponed to the washout catch up round on the weekend of 30/31 July.

Round 2

Round 3

Round 4

Round 5

Round 6

Round 7

Round 8

Round 9

Round 10

Round 11

Round 12

Round 13

Round 14

Round 15

Round 16

Round 17

Round 18

Ladies League Tag Division 1

Teams

Ladder

Regular season

Round 1 

 Round 1 was washed out and postponed to the washout catch up round on the weekend of 30/31 July.

Round 2

Round 3 

 The fixture between Jamberoo and Kiama was postponed due to playing conditions.

Round 4

Round 5

Round 6

Round 7

Round 8

Round 9

Round 10

Round 11

Round 12

Round 13

Round 14

Round 15

Round 16

Round 17

Ladies League Tag Division 2

Teams

Ladder

Regular season

Round 1 

 Round 1 was washed out and postponed to the washout catch up round on the weekend of 30/31 July.

Round 2

Round 3 

 The fixture between Jamberoo and Stingrays was postponed due to unplayable playing conditions.

Round 4

Round 5

Round 6

Round 7

Round 8

Round 9

Round 10

Round 11

Round 12

Round 13

Round 14

Round 15

Round 16

Round 17

References 

2022 in Australian rugby league
Rugby league in New South Wales
Rugby league competitions in New South Wales